The 2020 Stanford Cardinal football team represented Stanford University in the 2020 NCAA Division I FBS football season. The Cardinal were led by tenth-year head coach David Shaw. They played their home games at Stanford Stadium as members of the North Division of the Pac-12 Conference.

On August 11, the Pac-12 Conference initially canceled all fall sports competitions due to the COVID-19 pandemic. On September 24, the conference announced that a six-game conference-only season would begin on November 6, with the Pac-12 Championship Game to be played December 18. Teams not selected for the championship game would be seeded to play a seventh game.

On December 13, with a record of 3-2 and one game left to play, the program announced that it would not participate in any bowl game. The Cardinal won their final game, finishing their season with a 4-2 record.

Previous season

They finished the 2019 season 4–8, 3–6 in Pac-12 play, to finish last place in the North Division. This was Stanford's worst record since 2007 and the first time that they did not earn bowl eligibility since 2008.

Pac-12 media day

Pac-12 media poll 
In the Pac-12 preseason media poll, Stanford was voted to finish fourth in the Pac-12 North division.

Schedule
Stanford had games scheduled against William & Mary (September 5), Notre Dame (October 10), and BYU (November 28), but canceled these games on July 10 due to the Pac-12 Conference's decision to play a conference-only schedule due to the COVID-19 pandemic.

Personnel

Coaching staff

Game Summaries

at Oregon

Colorado

at California

at Washington

at Oregon State

at UCLA

Rankings

Players drafted into the NFL

References

Stanford
Stanford Cardinal football seasons
Stanford Cardinal football